Albertus L. Meyers (1890 – May 15, 1979) was an American music conductor and cornet player from Allentown, Pennsylvania. He was the bandmaster of the Allentown Band for fifty years, from 1926 to 1976. He was also a friend and exponent of John Philip Sousa. 

At Carnegie Hall in 1969, he conducted the Marching 97 in a work composed by Lehigh Professor Jonathan Elkus, Camino Real, Introduction and Pasodoble for Band. He had played cornet on the opening day celebration of the bridge in 1913. The Allentown Band continues to pay tribute to his memory with concerts honoring him.

In 1974, the Eighth Street Bridge in Allentown was renamed in his honor as the Albertus L. Meyers Bridge.

Discography
 The Allentown Band salutes the great German march writers.
 The Allentown Band plays marches for Bert's 85th birthday.

References

1890 births
1979 deaths
Musicians from Allentown, Pennsylvania
American bandleaders
20th-century American conductors (music)